Benjamin Lasky (born October 2, 2000), better known by his stage name Quadeca (formerly QuadecaX8), is an American rapper, singer-songwriter, record producer, YouTuber, and former video game commentator. He uploads rap songs, music videos, comedy sketches, and video gameplay to his YouTube channel.

Early life
Benjamin Lasky was born on October 2, 2000, in Los Angeles, California. He is of Ashkenazi Jewish and Canary Islander descent. His father, Mitch Lasky, is a Benchmark general partner and former entrepreneur and video game executive. Lasky became an avid soccer player as a child and was enthusiastic about hip hop and other forms of music. He also has a younger sister named Anna who was featured in some of his earliest videos, along with an older sister, Natasha. Lasky opened his YouTube channel on June 11, 2012, under the name QuadecaX8; his early videos being based around video game commentating and the FIFA franchise. He was admitted to Menlo School in 2015, where he joined the soccer team. Lasky continued to play with his soccer team through his student years and became a tri-captain of the team.

Career
In 2014, Lasky began to create rap-related content and freestyles for his channel. He performed at a middle school talent show in February that went viral on YouTube. On September 16, 2015, at the age of 14, he released his debut mixtape Work in Progress. The mixtape acquired 10 million streams on Spotify with the stand-out song "Wii Music Fire" attracting over 7 million streams on Spotify. He released his second mixtape Nostalgia for the Now on May 11, 2016.

On January 31, 2017, Lasky released his third mixtape Bad Internet Rapper and followed it up with his fourth mixtape, Out of Order in November of that year. In early 2018, Lasky released two singles "Clouted Up" and "Heart Attack." In October 2018, he teamed up with Saint G to drop a joint project, 1Day, produced in one day.

In late 2018, KSI called out Quadeca and other YouTube rappers claiming they were frauds. Lasky responded with a diss track "Insecure" within a week. The music video acquired over 8 million views within 10 days. In November, KSI gave a review of the track and praised it, saying that it warranted a diss track from himself. He responded to with his own diss "Ares," to which Lasky gave a lukewarm response in a tweet. Logan Paul revealed that he had wanted to collaborate with Lasky to diss KSI as well, but was denied.

On March 8, 2019, he released his debut studio album Voice Memos, and on March 22, Voice Memos peaked at No. 42 on Billboard's Independent Albums and Heatseekers Albums. He was invited to explain the lyrics of the song "Uh Huh!" on a Genius interview.

He was featured as a guest on the song "Roll the Dice" from KSI and Randolph's collaborative album New Age on April 12, 2019. On April 21, 2019, Lasky released the single "Not a Diss Track". On May 12, Twista reacted to him and other new rappers on Genius's The Cosign, where he criticized Lasky for being "corny." On May 26, he released a music video to "The Man on my Left Shoulder." On August 1, 2019, Lasky released the single "Tomfoolery" with Egovert, Kil, and Moxas. On September 6, he released the single "I Don't Care", and on September 27, Quadeca and Moxas released "Schoenberg." At the end of the Schoenberg music video, he announced his next album From Me To You, which was set to release in early 2020. Quadeca went on to release two more singles that year, "Fish Outta Bacardi" with EGOVERT and "Beamin’", produced by Mathias Tyner.

In March 2020, he announced the lead single for From Me To You, "Where'd You Go", which he then released in April. He was able to explain the lyrics in a second interview with Genius. In April he also announced the second single, "Alone Together", which was subsequently released later that month. Starting in August, Quadeca took a five-month hiatus from all social platforms, to finalize From Me To You.

On January 29, 2021, Lasky reannounced his second studio album titled From Me to You on YouTube, which released on March 30, 2021, under AWAL. He released the self-produced single "Sisyphus" on March 20, 2021, which garnered widespread critical praise.

On September 19, 2022, Lasky released the lead single to his third album I Didn't Mean to Haunt You, titled "Born Yesterday". He then released the album’s second single, titled "Tell Me a Joke", on October 25, 2022. On the same day, he announced his album, revealing the cover art, tracklist, and release date. I Didn't Mean to Haunt You was scheduled to release on November 11, 2022, however was ultimately released a day earlier on November 10.

Artistry

Style and influences
Lasky's early releases were categorized as YouTube rap but he has since diversified, combining elements of experimental hip hop, R&B and pop rap. His earlier projects were influenced by rappers like Logic and J Cole. In his second album From Me To You, Quadeca draws from influences such as Tyler, The Creator, Joji, Childish Gambino and Frank Ocean. Quadeca has cited artists such as The Microphones, Duster, Lingua Ignota, Björk and Caroline Polachek as influences for his third studio album I Didn't Mean To Haunt You.

Discography

Albums

Mixtapes

Singles

Guest appearances

References 

2000 births
Living people
21st-century American male singers
21st-century American rappers
American experimental musicians
American male rappers
American male singer-songwriters
American YouTubers
American people of Canarian descent
Canarian Jews
Emo rap musicians
Hispanic and Latino American rappers
Hispanic and Latino American singers
Jewish rappers
Jewish singers
Jewish songwriters
Music YouTubers
Rappers from Los Angeles
Record producers from California
Singer-songwriters from California